Carl Feilberg may refer to:

 Carl Adolph Feilberg (1810–1896), Danish businessman
 Carl Feilberg (1844–1887), Danish-Australian journalist
 Carl Gunnar Feilberg  (1894–1972), geographer and explorer
 Carl Adolph Feilberg (1844–1937), Danish medical doctor